House of Milan (HOM) was a successful publisher of bondage magazines and BDSM videos, that was mostly run by fetish photographer and producer Barbara Behr.  HOM was considered one of the three big houses during the period known as the Golden Age of Bondage productions, along with Harmony Communications (later renamed to Harmony Concepts) and California Star (Calstar) from approximately the mid 1970s to the late 1990s.

House of Milan was sold to Lyndon Distributors who occasionally reprints and reissues some of the magazines and films of HOM when it was an active company.

Some of HOM's longest-running titles have included:
 Bondage Classics (1972 - 1991)
 Bondage in the Buff (1982 - 1999)
 Bondage Photographer (1982 - 2000)
 Bound to Please (1972 - 1999)
 Captured  (1975 - 1999)
 Hogtie (1972 - 1992)
 Hogtied (1993 - 1999)
 Hush  (1993 - 1999)
 Kidnaped! (1975 - 1992)
 Knotty (1971 - 2002)
 Latent Image (1972 - 1995)
 Leashed (1983 - 2002)
 Now, Darling (1983 - 1992)
 Punished  (1978 - 2001)
 Slave Auction (1985 - 1992)
 Strict  (1982 - 1997)
 Men in Bondage  (1980 - 1985)
 Suspended  (1982 - 1992)
 Tied & Tickled (1981 - 1993)
 Ties That Bind (1985 - 1999)
 Tight Ropes (1980 - 2001)

References

External links
 Lyndon Distributors, successor of HOM and reissuer
 IMDb page on Barbara Behr

Bondage magazines
Magazine publishing companies of the United States